A nautical cable is a band of tightly woven and clamped ropes, of a defined cable length, used during the age of sail for deep water anchoring, heavy lifting, ship to ship transfers and towing during blue sea sailing and other uses.

Waterproof lines 

Ordinary rope is not waterproof. When a ship anchors in relatively deep water (greater than about ), the anchor and rope that is let down becomes prohibitively difficult to raise again, even with a mechanism like a capstan. This ultimately limits the depths available with  ordinary rope to within the weight bearing capacity of the rope. The rope will become so heavy with water it will break. 

Using a cable, the raising of the anchor, or any activity involving submerging the cable, is not more strenuous than lowering.

Hawsers 

Hawsers are not cables.  Hawsers are ropes of arbitrary length woven together to increase the strength of the overall line, but are not considered waterproof as the weave of the hawser goes with the weave of the ropes. This has been come to be known as "hawser laid" and "cable laid".  Confusion between cables and hawsers is rampant because both cables and hawsers can be used through the hawsehole.

References

 . Also "fathom", from the same work (pp. 88–89, retrieved 12 January 2017).
 .

Sailing